Borosi is a 2014 Indian Assamese-language suspense film directed by Prodyut Kumar Deka and produced by Debashish Goswami under Manjushree Films & Entertainment. It is based on a story written by politician and former Law Minister of India Dinesh Goswami. It was released on 18 April 2014.

Cast
 Taufique Rahman
 Jowan Dutta
 Madhusmita Borkotoki
 Nayan Prasad
 Mallika Sharma
 Kajori Konwar

See also
 List of Assamese films of 2014

References

2014 films
Films set in Assam
2010s Assamese-language films